Zoltán Várkonyi (13 May 1912 – 10 April 1979) was a Hungarian actor and film director. In 1961, he was a member of the jury at the 2nd Moscow International Film Festival. Four years later, he was a member of the jury at the 4th Moscow International Film Festival.

Selected filmography

Director
 Különös ismertetőjel (1955)
 Pillar of Salt (1958)
 Kárpáthy Zoltán (1966)
 Stars of Eger (1968)
 Szemtől szembe (1970)

Actor
 The Dream Car (1934)
 Black Diamonds (1938)
 Stars of Variety (1939)
 The Perfect Man (1939)
 Gül Baba (1940)
 A Tanítónő (1945)
 Iron Flower (1958)
 Story of My Foolishness (1966)
 Kárpáthy Zoltán (1966)

Bibliography
 Cunningham, John. Hungarian Cinema: From Coffee House to Multiplex. Wallflower Press, 2004.

References

External links

1912 births
1979 deaths
Hungarian film directors
Hungarian male film actors
Male actors from Budapest
20th-century Hungarian male actors
Artists of Merit of the Hungarian People's Republic